Mapeta cynosura is a species of snout moth in the genus Mapeta. It was described by Herbert Druce in 1895, and is known from Mexico (including Cuernavaca, Morelos, the type location).

References

Moths described in 1895
Pyralinae